Chargad Dam, is an earthfill dam on Chargad river near Amravati in state of Maharashtra in India.

Specifications

Purpose
 Irrigation
 Water Supply

See also
 Dams in Maharashtra
 List of reservoirs and dams in India

References

Dams in Amravati district
Dams completed in 2003
2003 establishments in Maharashtra